Enders Island is an 11-acre island located within the town of Stonington, just off the coast of the Mystic section of the town, in the U.S. state of Connecticut. The island located in the Fisher's Island Sound at the base of the Mystic River and is connected to neighboring Mason's Island by a causeway. Mason's Island is connected to the mainland by another causeway. Its sole inhabitants operate a retreat center and art school owned by the Catholic Society of Saint Edmund. Enders Island is also home to the bi-annual residency portion of Fairfield University's Master of Fine Arts in Creative Writing Program. The Island is available to the public, with a chapel, surrounding views of the Atlantic, walking paths with flower gardens and a gift store.

History

Dr. Thomas B. Enders, the son of the president of Aetna Insurance Company, purchased the island from the Sisters of Charity and in 1918 he and his wife Alys VanGilder Enders designed and oversaw the construction of a private estate with a grand main house decorated in Arts and Crafts style. The grounds still feature the Enders' imported Italian tiles in the house and garden, and a surrounding wall of large boulders that serves as a windbreak.

Before her death in 1954, Alys willed the island to the Society of Saint Edmund, requesting that it be used as a retreat and place of spiritual training for priests in the diocese. An independent ministry was established on the island in 2003.

Programs
The St. Edmund's Center residential addiction and recovery program began in the 1960s and is based on the 12-step recovery program with an emphasis on prayer and meditation. Its spiritual ministry hosts private and guided retreats for individuals, couples and groups.

The Sacred Art Institute at Enders Island was founded in the 1995 and offers classes and workshops to the public. With a focus on religious art formats and techniques, classes include iconography, stained glass, mosaics, calligraphy, wood-carving and manuscript illumination. The Institute also offers workshops in Gregorian chants with live recordings performed in the onsite Chapel of Our Lady of the Assumption.

Nearby islands

 Mason's Island
 Ram Island
 Elihu Island
 Fishers Island, New York

References

External links
Enders Island

Mystic, Connecticut
Stonington, Connecticut
Landforms of New London County, Connecticut
Coastal islands of Connecticut
Private islands of Connecticut
Fairfield University
Long Island Sound